Sabanejewia aurata is a species of ray-finned fish in the family Cobitidae.
It is found in Afghanistan, Armenia, Azerbaijan, Bulgaria, Croatia, Georgia, Hungary, Iran, Romania, Russia, Ukraine, and Uzbekistan.

Sources

Cobitidae
Fish described in 1863
Taxa named by Filippo De Filippi
Taxonomy articles created by Polbot